The Advance Australia Foundation (AAF) was established in 1980. The AAF recognised "individuals or groups who have made outstanding contributions to the growth and enhancement of Australia, the Australian people and the Australian way of life". It was wound up in the mid-1990s.

Award recipients
Awards given by the AAF included the Advance Australia Award and the Special Merit Advance Australia Award. Recipients of the Advance Australia Award included:

1994:
 Murray Godfrey, for services to the community

1993:
 Patricia Barnard, for services to adult literacy
 Tracy Barrell, for services to sport.
 Zanna Barron for work with suffers of multiple sclerosis
 Phoebe Fraser, daughter of former prime minister Malcolm Fraser and representative of CARE Australia, for services to international care
 Wayne Gardner, for services to international goodwill
 Allen Henry with his dog Brutus, for services to youth
 Craig Heading for services to science and technology
 Alan Jones, broadcaster and rugby league coach, for services to the community.
 Petrea King for services to crisis counseling
 Dulcie Magnus for efforts with the visually impaired
 Yvonne Stewart for work in special education.

1990:
 Professor Fred Hollows, for Medicine and Overseas Aid

1983:
 Australia II, for winning the Americas Cup
1982:
 (Athol Thomas) for his services in promoting Western Australia
1981:
 Professor Fred Hollows, for Aboriginal eye care
 Joe Dolce, Export Excellence for the international success of his song Shaddap You Face.
 Norman Harwood, Transportation History at the Museum of Applied Arts and Sciences 
 Mary Lidbetter, Local History.

1980:
 Prue Acton, for contribution to fashion
 Charles Malpas, inventor of wine cask tap

Government funding
The AAF was for several years partly funded by the Federal Government. This ended in 1986 when the AAF become involved in the Australian Made campaign, which the Government decided it would prefer to fund directly.

Since 2012, the Federal Government has funded annual Advance Awards, for innovation and achievement, to Australian citizens who live overseas or who have done so in the past.

See also
 Order of Australia

References

External links
 Photograph of an enameled pin from the 1980s

Australian awards
1980 establishments in Australia
Awards established in 1980
Foundations based in Australia